Paratrechodes macleayi is a species of beetle in the family Carabidae, the only species in the genus Paratrechodes.

References

Trechinae